Sphaerotheca leucorhynchus (common names: Wattakole bullfrog, Rao's burrowing frog, Rao's white-banded frog) is a species of frog in the family Dicroglossidae. It is endemic to India: it is only known from its type locality in Kodagu district, Karnataka, in southern India. The type specimen is lost, and this name might be a junior synonym of Sphaerotheca breviceps.

References

Sphaerotheca (frog)
Endemic fauna of the Western Ghats
Frogs of India
Fauna of Karnataka
Taxa named by C. R. Narayan Rao
Taxonomy articles created by Polbot
Amphibians described in 1937